A so-called  carpet knight was a person who had been awarded a title of  knighthood by the king of England on a holiday occasion (or in time of peace), as opposed to knighthoods awarded for military service, or success in tournament games.

Notes and Queries explained in 1862:

Philip Massinger in his play The Maid of Honour, written in the 1620s, mentioned "loose Carpet-knights" who lived comfortably and "thought to charge, through dust and blood, an armed foe, Was but like graceful running at the ring, For a wanton mistress' glove".

Notes

English knights by type or order of chivalry